Pasta Bravo was a fast casual restaurant of Irvine, California. At its height, Pasta Bravo operated 16 restaurants throughout the Orange and San Diego counties.

History
Pasta Bravo was founded by Tim Aspel in 1988, at The Crossroads Center in Irvine. Some of the meals were Meat Lasagna and Chicken Parmigiana in addition to more contemporary offerings such as Chicken Basil Cream and Greek-Style Shrimp and Arugula. Pasta Bravo soon gained popularity and expanded to a total of 16 restaurants in Orange and San Diego counties.

In August 2002, Pasta Bravo and Yum! Brands agreed to test co-branded Bravo/Pizza Hut restaurants. In 2003 Yum! acquired the Pasta Bravo concept from Pasta Bravo, Inc. for $5 million ($ million today), intending to pair it with Pizza Hut. The first freestanding Pizza Hut/PastaBravo was opened in Clarksville, Tennessee by franchisee Carreca Enterprises Inc.

After the deal with Yum!, the Pasta Bravo chain was closed within eight years. When the last restaurant closed, in December 2011, Aspel remarked, "The future wasn't in what I was doing anymore. Over the years, people's tastes ha[d] gone from carbs to proteins." Three months later, Aspel switched to a grilled seafood concept with locations of Spike's Fish House.

References

Fast casual restaurants
Restaurants in California
Companies based in Irvine, California
Defunct companies based in California
Restaurants established in 1988
Restaurants disestablished in 2011
1988 establishments in California
2011 disestablishments in California
Yum! Brands
2003 mergers and acquisitions
Defunct restaurants in California